is a passenger railway station located in the city of Yoshinogawa, Tokushima Prefecture, Japan. It is operated by JR Shikoku and has the station number "B08".

Lines
Only local trains stop at the station.

Layout
The station, which is unstaffed, consists of a side platform serving a single track. There is no station building, only a shelter on the platform for waiting passengers. A ramp leads up to the platform from the access road.

Adjacent stations

History
Oezuka Station was opened on 20 September 1934 by Japanese Government Railways (JGR) on the then Tokushima Main Line. On 10 August 1941 the station was closed. It was reopened on 1 November 1957. With the privatization of Japanese National Railways (JNR), the successor of JGR, on 1 April 1987, the station came under the control of JR Shikoku. On 1 June 1988, the line was renamed the Tokushima Line.

Surrounding area
Japan National Route 192
Yoshinogawa City Kamoshima Higashi Junior High School

See also
 List of Railway Stations in Japan

References

External links

 JR Shikoku timetable

Railway stations in Tokushima Prefecture
Railway stations in Japan opened in 1934
Yoshinogawa, Tokushima